The Tanzanian Women's Premier League called Serengeti Lite Women's Premier League is the top flight of women's association football in Tanzania. The competition is run by the Tanzania Football Federation.

History
The first Tanzanian women's league was contested in 2016-17 season. The winner of the first edition was Mlandizi Queens.

Champions
The list of champions and runners-up:

Most successful clubs

References

External links 
 Serengeti Lite Women's Premier League - TFF official website

Women's association football leagues in Africa
Women
2016 establishments in Tanzania
Sports leagues established in 2016
Women's football in Tanzania